Quldur Kohli (also Romanized as Qūldūr Kohlī; also known as Qoldor Kohlī) is a village in Arshaq-e Gharbi Rural District, Moradlu District, Meshgin Shahr County, Ardabil Province, Iran. At the 2006 census, its population was 231, in 43 families.

References 

Towns and villages in Meshgin Shahr County